Stawell railway station is located on the Western standard gauge line in Victoria, Australia. It serves the town of Stawell, and it opened on 14 April 1876.

It was the temporary terminus of the line from Ararat until 17 December 1878, when the line was extended to Murtoa.

History

The station was first built in 1877, following the extension of the Serviceton line from Ararat. The Ararat to Stawell railway line was first approved by the Victorian Government by Act No. 475, which passed into law on 25 November 1873. In 1876, the Ararat to Stawell line was completed, and a temporary station was set up just south of the town. This was named Wild Cat, and was only used until the completion of the current station.

Boom barriers were provided at the nearby Seaby Street level crossing in 1978, replacing hand-operated gates.

In 1981, the former water tower was dismantled. The tower dated back to around 1910–15.

Rationalisation of the yard occurred in 1984, including removing two roads at the Up end, and No. 4 road also was abolished. This resulted in triple crosses almost impossible to occur.

CTC signalling was provided at Stawell during 1985. Rationalisation also occurred again around this time, with No. 2 road (crossing loop) abolished, along with two signal boxes.

The station was served by V/Line Dimboola services, until these services were withdrawn on 21 August 1993. After passenger services ceased, the Stawell and District Cultural Associated was formed. In March 1995, the association was granted use of the station, with an art gallery opened.

For a number of years after the discontinuation of the Dimboola service, local residents called for The Overland to make an additional stop at Stawell. When it was announced that The Overland would additionally stop at Nhill in 2007, Stawell, despite representations made, was not included. This was redressed, and in April 2011, The Overland commenced stopping at Stawell, with 60 seats available.  upgrade was carried out to the station in preparation for the return of train services.

Platforms and services

Stawell has one platform. It is serviced by Journey Beyond The Overland services.

Platform 1:
 services to Adelaide Parklands and Melbourne Southern Cross

Transport Links

Sandlant Buses operates two routes via Stawell station, under contract to Public Transport Victoria:
: Stawell – Stawell South
: Stawell – Stawell North

V/Line operates a road coach service from Stawell station to Halls Gap.

Gallery

References

External links
Rail Geelong gallery
Victorian Railway Stations gallery

Railway stations in Australia opened in 1877
Regional railway stations in Victoria (Australia)
Stawell, Victoria